

The Vickers Type 123 was a 1920s British single-seat biplane fighter designed and built by Vickers Limited as a private venture. The only Type 123 was later modified into the Type 141 but, not winning any orders, it was scrapped in 1930.

Design and development 
The Type 123 was a conventional biplane powered by a 400 hp (298 kW) Hispano-Suiza T52 (Hispano 12 Jb) engine, built at Weybridge Aerodrome in 1926. It was registered as G-EBNQ in February 1926 and first flew on 11 September 1926. In 1927 it had a 480 hp (358 kW) Rolls-Royce F.XI engine fitted and was redesignated Type 141. It competed unsuccessfully in an Air Ministry fighter procurement competition in January 1928. Without winning any orders the aircraft was scrapped in 1930.

Specifications (Type 123)

References 

Notes

Bibliography

 
 

1920s British fighter aircraft
Type 123
Carrier-based aircraft
Aircraft first flown in 1926